Celcius is a compilation album by rapper Tech N9ne. It was released by Midwestside Records after Tech N9ne parted ways with the label. It contains a collection of songs he had previously recorded while still with the label, most unreleased until this point, though it also contains 3 songs where he does not appear.

"He Wanna Be Paid" had previously been released on the 0 to 60 Records compilation Midwest Mobbin under the title "Get Yo Paper". "Boss Doggs" is a remix of the song "Boss Doggin" from the 57th Street Rogue Dog ' album My Dogs For Life while "Sprung" makes an appearance after appearing on the Live From The Ghetto compilation where it appeared under the title of "Blank Zone", a misspelling of the actual name, "Biank Zone." "Be Warned" was a title track to his 2000 album that got shelved.

Track listing

2002 albums
Tech N9ne albums
Gangsta rap albums by American artists